Vincenzo Torelli (died 1539) was a Roman Catholic prelate who served as Bishop of Lesina (1538–1539).

On 7 October 1538, Vincenzo Torelli was appointed during the papacy of Pope Paul III as Bishop of Lesina.
He served as Bishop of Lesina until his death in 1539.

References 

16th-century Italian Roman Catholic bishops
Bishops appointed by Pope Paul III
1539 deaths